Syllepte benedictalis is a moth in the family Crambidae. It was described by William Jacob Holland in 1900. It is found in Buru, Indonesia.

References

Moths described in 1900
benedictalis
Moths of Indonesia